James Thompson (born 4 June 1961) is a Nevisian cricketer. He played in nine first-class matches for the Leeward Islands from 1983 to 1989.

See also
 List of Leeward Islands first-class cricketers

References

External links
 

1961 births
Living people
Nevisian cricketers
Leeward Islands cricketers